RDE may refer to:

 Redundant data elimination, the process of reducing file storage requirements through data deduplication
 Revue d'Égyptologie, a scholarly journal of Egyptology (commonly abbreviated RdE)
Rotating detonation engine, a rocket engine that uses continuous detonation to provide thrust.
 Rotating disk electrode, a type of electrode used in electrochemistry
 Remote data entry, a process for the collection of data in electronic format
 Rule-developing experimentation, a term used in market research
 European Democratic Alliance (Rassemblement des Démocrates Européens), a political group in the European Parliament 1984–1995.
European Democratic and Social Rally group, formerly the Democratic and European Rally group (groupe du Rassemblement démocratique et européen), a parliamentary group in the French Senate
 Real Driving Emissions, see European emission standards.